Coe is a given name, mainly, but not exclusively masculine, which may refer to:

 Coe Finch Austin (1831–1880), American educator and botanist
 Coe Booth, 21st-century American fiction writer
 Coe I. Crawford (1858–1944), American attorney and politician, governor of and senator from South Dakota
 Coe S. Downing (1791–1847), American politician
 Coe Glade (1900–1985), American opera singer
 Chester Coe Swobe (1929–2016), American politician

English-language given names